Bash (originally named Jonikal, then Sokar) is a luxury yacht formerly owned by Egyptian businessman Mohamed Al-Fayed, the former owner of Harrods department store in Knightsbridge. The vessel was sold in 2014 after being on the market for many years. Until July 2021 she was named after the Egyptian mythology falcon god Sokar. She was renamed Bash on July 15, 2021. The yacht was designed by naval architect Vincenzo Ruggiero in the late 1980s and built by Codecasa in Italy and launched in 1990. She has a length of  making her the 89th largest yacht in the world in 2007. She is equipped with two  engines.

Al-Fayed has often kept the yacht moored in the harbour of Monaco since the 1990s but she is registered in Bermuda and flies the Flag of Bermuda. In August 1997 Mohamed's son Dodi Fayed and Diana, Princess of Wales were extensively photographed on the yacht shortly before their deaths in Paris.

Yachting Partners International have attempted to buy the yacht on numerous occasions, offering $32 million and $30 million for the yacht in 2005. In 2001 Al-Fayed had also attempted to sell the yacht for a reported $40 million. After years on the market and numerous price reductions, she was finally sold in 2014 to an unknown buyer for under $13 million.

References

External links

Motor yachts
Ships of Monaco
Ships built in Italy
1990 ships